Clara Hill is a musician born in Berlin. She writes, produces and performs with a varied array of artists. Her discography includes 6 full-length albums (Sonar Kollektiv Berlin, Tapete Records, King Britt Archives), and many 12“s featuring names of electronica artists like Jazzanova, King Britt, Marc Mac (4 Hero), Atjazz, Vikter Duplaix and Dixon. Coming from a singer-songwriter / acid jazz / electronica background.

In 2013 she released her fourth album Walk The Distance on Tapete Records. Clara produced and released her fifth LP called Pendulous Moon with King Britt in 2016. Her sixth album was released in 2020.

Discography

Albums
 Restless Times (2004 Sonar Kollektiv)
 All I Can Provide (2006 Sonar Kollektiv)
 Folkwaves-Sideways (2007 Sonar Kollektiv)
 Walk The Distance (2013 Tapete Records)
 Pendulous Moon (2016 KingBrittArchives)
 Shine (2020 Black Pearl Records)

Singles
 "Here" (2003)
 "Restless Times" (2005)
 "Silent Distance" (2005)
 "Did I Do Wrong" (2006)
 "Nowhere (I Can Go)" (2006)
 "Paperchase" (2006)
 "Everything" (2007)
 "Be like that" (2007)
 "Sad Girl" (2008)
 "Lost Winter" (2013)
 "Insomnia" (2014)
 "Dripstone Cave" (2014)
 "Lonely Glow" (2016)
 "Silent Roar" (2016)

References

External links
 – official site

Clara Hill official fan page on Facebook

German electronic musicians
Folktronica musicians
German singer-songwriters
Living people
Sonar Kollektiv artists
Women in electronic music
Year of birth missing (living people)
21st-century German women singers
Downtempo musicians
Acid jazz musicians
German experimental musicians
Tapete Records artists
Musicians from Berlin